Dittelbrunn is a municipality in the district of Schweinfurt in Bavaria, Germany.

Dittelbrunn consists of 4 parts: Dittelbrunn, Holzhausen und Pfändhausen.

Dittelbrunn:
Biggest part with 3741 inhabitants.

Hambach:
Second biggest part with 2676 inhabitants.

Pfändhausen:
Northern part with 616 inhabitants

Holzhausen:
Smallest part with 441 inhabitants.

References

External links
 

Schweinfurt (district)